Michael Weishan (born 7 August in Milwaukee, Wisconsin)  is an American television personality. He was host of the public television series The Victory Garden from 2001 through 2007. He was the fourth host of the series, and retired after five seasons to resume active direction of his landscape design firm, Michael Weishan and Associates, which specializes in creating traditionally inspired landscapes for homes across the US and Canada.

In addition to his work on PBS, Weishan has appeared on numerous national TV programs in the United States, including the Today Show on NBC, as well as the CBS Early Show. On radio, he hosted his own weekly NPR program, The Cultivated Gardener from 1999–2001.  Weishan is also the author of three books on horticulture: The New Traditional Garden (1999); From a Victorian Garden (2004); and The Victory Garden Companion (2006).

The gardening editor at Country Living for five years, Weishan was a frequent contributor to various national periodicals, including New Old House Magazine where he wrote a quarterly gardening column. Weishan also maintains an active lecture schedule across the United States and Europe, speaking to organizations such as garden clubs, trade shows and museums on a wide range of horticultural subjects, with special emphasis on residential garden design and landscape history, his particular fields of expertise. Weishan's research in landscape design overlaps with a lifelong love of architecture, architectural design and archaeology, and his first published work (1991) was as editor and co-contributor (along with noted Harvard archaeologist George M.A. Hanfmann) of The Byzantine Shops at Sardis, volume 9 of the Sardis Archaeological Series published by the Harvard University Press.

Weishan maintains an internet presence as well, writing a regular column on his website, entitled "Old House, Old Garden" which narrates the "tales, tips and techniques of Traditional Gardening." The "Old House, New Garden" blog is the online continuation and expansion of Traditional Gardening, the magazine Weishan published in print form from 1996–2000.

An honors graduate of Harvard College in Classics and Romance Languages, Weishan is active in many charities and non-profit institutions, especially those relating to history and design. Among these, he is a member of the Adams House Senior Common Room at Harvard, where he is executive director of the Franklin Delano Roosevelt Foundation, an organization that has completed the restoration of Franklin Delano Roosevelt's student rooms – the FDR Suite at Adams House, Harvard University. The Foundation has restored the Suite to its original 1904 appearance as a memorial to the 32nd president of the United States, which is the only one at Harvard. In addition, the FDR Foundation sponsors a host of educational activities, including the annual Franklin Delano Roosevelt Memorial lecture at Adams House; and an undergraduate summer internship program , The Roosevelt Scholars. The Foundation is also home to a think-tank, The FDR Center for Global Engagement, which seeks practical solutions to real-world problems of climate change, governance, and social justice. In his role as executive director of the Foundation, Weishan authored a new biography of Franklin Delano Roosevelt entitled FDR: A Life in Pictures in 2013. As president of the Southborough Massachusetts Historical Society, he published "Lost Southborough" a picture history that documents the ravages of development suffered by his adopted hometown over the last century.

Major publications
Weishan, Michael. (1999)The New Traditional Garden: A Practical Guide to Creating and Restoring Authentic American Gardens for Homes of All Ages. 
Weishan, Michael. (2004) From a Victorian Garden: Creating the Romance of a Bygone Age Right in Your Own Backyard. 
Weishan, Michael. (2006) The Victory Garden Companion. 
Weishan, Michael. (2013) FDR: A Life in Pictures. 
Weishan, Michael. (2019) Lost Southborough. 
Archaeological Exploration of Sardis (Book 9, 1991). The Byzantine Shops at Sardis.  (Contributor/editor)

External links
Michael Weishan's World of Gardening
Michael Weishan's Old House, New Garden Blog
Franklin Delano Roosevelt Foundation

People from Milwaukee
American television hosts
American garden writers
American male non-fiction writers
Living people
Harvard College alumni
Year of birth missing (living people)